Indradhanu is a TV channel specialising in movies of Assam. It was launched on 15 April 2017 and is a part of the Pride East Entertainments Pvt. Ltd. based in Guwahati, Assam owned by Riniki Bhuyan Sarma. It is the first ever satellite movie TV channel of the northeast India. The channel broadcast recently released movies and shortfilms in Assamese, Hindi, Bengali and other regional languages.

The channel will also have a music show, The Legend, which will feature popular Assamese, Hindi, Bengali and other regional-language songs.

References

Television stations in Guwahati
Assamese-language mass media
Assamese-language television channels
Television channels and stations established in 2017
Pride East Entertainments

Movie channels in India